Indio Hills Palms Park Property and the Coachella Valley Preserve, located in the Indio Hills, contain the Thousand Palms Oasis and are a protected area in the Coachella Valley, located east of Palm Springs near Palm Desert, California. The Coachella Valley National Wildlife Refuge is contained within the Coachella Valley Preserve, and all are in the Colorado Desert section of the Sonoran Desert and adjacent to the Lower Colorado River Valley region.

California Fan Palm oasis
The Indio Hills Palms Park Property is managed by the California Department of Parks and Recreation. The Coachella Valley Preserve, a 2,206-acre (8.93 km2) area, is maintained by the non-profit Nature Conservancy and is one of the few in the desert with an oasis fed by natural springs that supports the only California native palm, the Washingtonia filifera, or California Fan Palm. The San Andreas Fault, visible from the valley floor as a line of greenery along the base of the hills, captures groundwater that nurtures the palms. The 1,000 Palms Oasis grove is easily reached by foot from the trailhead.

Desert pupfish
Naturally occurring artesian ponds provide habitat for the Desert pupfish, a small, endangered species of freshwater fish - roughly the size of a young goldfish.  These ponds are part of the self-guided tour among the California Fan Palm groves.

Coachella Valley Fringe-toed Lizard
The Coachella Valley National Wildlife Refuge is a restricted access habitat for the Coachella Valley Fringe-toed Lizard, listed as an endangered species in California, a threatened species in the United States and the IUCN classifies it as endangered.

See also

 :Category:Geography of the Colorado Desert
 :Category:Fauna of the Colorado Desert
 List of Sonoran Desert wildflowers

References

External links
 Official Coachella Valley Preserve website
 Coachella Valley Preserve: McCallum trail hiking
 1,000 Palms Oasis historical photographs
 1,000 Palms Oasis birds checklist
 Indio Hills Palms State Park
 Coachella Valley National Wildlife Refuge
 Coachella Valley National Wildlife Refuge Map
 Center for Natural Lands Management: Coachella Valley Preserve 
 
 

Protected areas of the Colorado Desert
Coachella Valley
Indio, California
Oases of California
Nature Conservancy preserves
California State Reserves
Protected areas of Riverside County, California
Nature reserves in California